Big Horn County is the name of two counties in the United States:

 Big Horn County, Montana 
 Big Horn County, Wyoming